Frege: Philosophy of Mathematics is a 1991 book about the philosopher Gottlob Frege by the British philosopher Michael Dummett.

Reception
Frege: Philosophy of Mathematics has been highly influential. Together with Frege: Philosophy of Language (1973), it is Dummett's chief contribution to Frege scholarship.

References

Bibliography
Books

 

1991 non-fiction books
Books about Gottlob Frege
Books by Michael Dummett
English-language books
Logic books
Philosophy of mathematics literature